Unknown of Monte Carlo (French: L'inconnue de Monte Carlo) is a 1939 French drama film directed by  André Berthomieu and starring  Dita Parlo, Albert Préjean and Jules Berry. A separate Italian version The Woman of Monte Carlo was also made.

Cast
Dita Parlo as Véra  
Albert Préjean as Georges Duclos  
Jules Berry as Messirian  
 as André 

Enrico Glori 
 as Le détective  
Gaston Mauger

References

External links

French drama films
1939 drama films
Films directed by André Berthomieu
Italian drama films
French multilingual films
French black-and-white films
1939 multilingual films
1930s French-language films
1930s French films